Sunayani Devi (18 June 1875 – 23 February 1962) was an Bengali painter born into the aristocratic Tagore family in Calcutta, West Bengal. She was a self taught artist, with no academic training in art. Inspired by her brothers, Abanindranath Tagore, Gaganendranath Tagore, and Samarendranath Tagore, she started painting only at the age of 30. She was married at the age of 12 to the grandson of Raja Ram Mohan Roy.

Early life 
Sunayani Devi was born on 18 June 1875 in the historically influential Tagore family in Calcutta to Gunendranath Thakur and Soudamini Devi. She was married at the age of 12  to Rajanimohan Chattopadhyaya. According to the writer, Partha Mitter, she never had formal training in art other than the art and music lessons as feminine accomplishments.

Painting style and themes 
Known to be a true primitive of the Bengal Art School, she drew inspiration from the Pata folk painting style which was familiar to the women of the Tagore household, often depicting scenes from Indian epics and mythologies in her works. Some of her notable works are Sadhika, Ardhanarisvar, Satir Dehatyag, Milk Maids and Yashoda and Krishna. According to Stella Kramrisch, she was the first modern painter in India. Her works were exhibited in 1922 as part of the Bauhaus artists' exhibition in Calcutta. Since the beginning, her works have been original and bold. They resemble the ancient Jain manuscript paintings. She applied wash technique to its fullest and later her works echoed the native imagery like village clay dolls that would be used as ornamentation. Her works are an amalgamation of modernist dialogue of primitive simplicity and a larger national discourse of being rooted in its cultural identity, thus carving her image as a nationalist artist. Critical analyses of her portraits, have led her to be addressed as a naive painter, who used folk themes with allure and sensitivity.

Exhibitions 
Among Devi's exhibitions are:
 1908, 10, 12 Exhb., Indian Society of Oriental Art, Calcutta
 1911 United Provinces Exhb. organised by Indian Society of Oriental Art, Allahabad
 1911 Festival of Empire, organised by Indian Society of Oriental Art for George V's coronation, Crystal Palace, London
 1924 Travelling exhb. organised by Indian Society of Oriental Art and American Federation of Art, USA
 2004 Manifestations II, organised by Delhi Art Gallery, Jehangir Art Gallery, Mumbai and Delhi Art Gallery, New Delhi
 2011 Summer Oasis, organised by Chitrakoot Art Gallery, Kolkata

Museums 
Sunayani Devi's paintings are part of the collection of many museums, including:
 Indian Museum Kolkata
 National Gallery of Modern Art, Bangalore
 National Gallery of Modern Art, New Delhi
 National Art Gallery, Chennai
 Sri Chitra Art Gallery, Thiruvananthapuram
 Jaganmohan Palace, Mysore
 University of Lucknow
 Rabindra Bharati University Museum, Kolkata
 Academy of Fine Arts, Kolkata

References

External links 

 Profile on Google Arts & Culture
 Profile on indianculture.gov.in

Painters from West Bengal
Indian women painters
Artists from Kolkata
Tagore family
Bengal Renaissance
20th-century Indian painters
Women artists from West Bengal
20th-century Indian women artists
1875 births
1962 deaths
Bengali Hindus
Painters in British India